Nuon may refer to:

 Nuon (DVD technology), a technology for DVD players
 N.V. Nuon Energy, a utility company from the Netherlands
 Nuon Chea (1926–2019), Cambodian politician and war criminal